Horntown is a town in Hughes County, Oklahoma, United States. The population was 97 at the 2010 census, up from the figure of 61 recorded in 2000.

History
Horntown is the center of a dispersed rural community in Jacobs Township of Hughes County that formed in the 1920s. The earliest inhabitants, according to the Encyclopedia of Oklahoma History and Culture, were T. C. Horn and Charley Hawthorn, who operated retail stores, garages, and gasoline stations and a restaurant at the crossroads of two section-line roads that are now U.S. Highways 75 and 270.

When Horntown incorporated on August 2, 1995, it comprised 4.021 square miles. Also in that year, the population of the immediate area served by Horntown's businesses included approximately 200 residents. Subsequently, the U.S. Census of 2000 counted 61 residents inside the town limits. The census of 2010 recorded an official population increase to 97. At that time, a convenience store–restaurant, a gasoline station, and a tire store operated. The Horntown fire department, law enforcement, and emergency services maintained a small complex of buildings, and the Banner Baptist Church served residents.

Geography
Horntown is located in central Hughes County at  (35.084025, -96.249711). The lightly populated town is centered on the intersection of U.S. Routes 75 and 270. US 75 leads north  to Wetumka, while US 270 leads west  to Holdenville, the Hughes county seat. The two highways join in Horntown and lead south  to Calvin.

The town drains north via Grief Creek and Graves Creek to Wewoka Creek, a tributary of the North Canadian River.

Demographics

As of the census of 2000, there were 61 people, 27 households, and 21 families residing in the town. The population density was 15.2 people per square mile (5.9/km2). There were 30 housing units at an average density of 7.5 per square mile (2.9/km2). The racial makeup of the town was 88.52% White and 11.48% Native American.

There were 27 households, out of which 25.9% had children under the age of 18 living with them, 70.4% were married couples living together, 3.7% had a female householder with no husband present, and 22.2% were non-families. 18.5% of all households were made up of individuals, and 7.4% had someone living alone who was 65 years of age or older. The average household size was 2.26 and the average family size was 2.57.

In the town, the population was spread out, with 14.8% under the age of 18, 8.2% from 18 to 24, 27.9% from 25 to 44, 36.1% from 45 to 64, and 13.1% who were 65 years of age or older. The median age was 44 years. For every 100 females, there were 90.6 males. For every 100 females age 18 and over, there were 100.0 males.

The median income for a household in the town was $36,250, and the median income for a family was $54,583. Males had a median income of $29,167 versus $22,500 for females. The per capita income for the town was $16,802. There were no families and 6.9% of the population living below the poverty line, including no under eighteens and none of those over 64.

References

External links
 Horntown community website

Towns in Hughes County, Oklahoma
Towns in Oklahoma